The 2001 Goodwill Games was the fifth and final edition of the international multi-sport event. The competition was held in Brisbane, Queensland, Australia from 29 August to 9 September 2001. A total around 1300 athletes took part in 14 sporting competitions.

The small scale opening ceremony was held at the Brisbane Entertainment Centre at Boondall and featured The Corrs and Keith Urban. There was a live audience of 10,000 and the ceremony was broadcast live to an international audience of 450 million viewers.

The Goodwill Bridge, a pedestrian and cyclist bridge spanning the Brisbane River, is named after the games.

Venues
Brisbane Convention & Exhibition Centre – artistic gymnastics, basketball, boxing, rhythmic gymnastics, trampoline, weightlifting 
ANZ Stadium – athletics
South Bank Piazza – beach volleyball
Chandler Velodrome – cycling
Chandler Aquatic Centre – diving, swimming 
Brisbane Entertainment Centre – figure skating
Kurrawa Beach, Gold Coast – surf lifesaving

Sports
There were 155 events across 15 sports:

Medal table

Participation
Athletes from 58 countries took part in the 2001 Goodwill Games.

;Notes
 The number of athletes in each country's team is shown in parentheses, where known.
 A few athletes from these countries also competed for multinational all-star teams in events such as track relays and swimming relays.

See also
1982 Commonwealth Games
2018 Commonwealth Games
2032 Summer Olympics

References

External links
 

 
Goodwill Games
Goodwill Games
Goodwill Games
Sports competitions in Brisbane
Multi-sport events in Australia
August 2001 sports events in Australia
September 2001 sports events in Australia
2000s in Brisbane